KROO (1430 AM) is a radio station with a news/talk format, licensed to Breckenridge, Texas.

History
KROO was licensed in 1947 as KSTB. It was owned by Stephens County Broadcasting Company and operated as a daytimer with 500 watts, later increased to 1,000.

In 1956, the original owners sold the station to Coy Perry and C.M. Hatch, who sold to Hugh McBeath the next year. Breckenridge Radio acquired KSTB in 1963. Regal Broadcasting Corporation (in 1967) and Bintz Broadcasting (in 1979) were later owners.

In 1993, KSTB became KBIL, with the callsign changed to KROO in 1997.

On November 17, 2003 KROO changed its format from soft adult contemporary to oldies. It flipped to adult contemporary on April 23, 2007 and to news/talk on January 10, 2017.

References

External links

News and talk radio stations in the United States
ROO